Rho GTPase-activating protein 1 is an enzyme that in humans is encoded by the ARHGAP1 gene.

Interactions 

ARHGAP1 has been shown to interact with:
 BNIP2 
 CDC42,  and
 RHOA.

References

External links

Further reading